Nick Wolters (born 5 August 1993) is a Dutch football player. He plays for Swedish club AFC Eskilstuna.

Career

Club career
He made his Eerste Divisie debut for FC Dordrecht on 1 September 2017 in a game against FC Emmen.

In the summer 2018, Wolters moved to Sweden and joined Gottne IF. He left the club at the end of 2019, to join Division 3 Södra Svealand club Eskilstuna City FK for the 2020 season.

Ahead of the 2021, he joined Superettan club AFC Eskilstuna.

References

External links
 

1993 births
Sportspeople from Kerkrade
Living people
Dutch footballers
Dutch expatriate footballers
Association football goalkeepers
Roda JC Kerkrade players
FC Dordrecht players
Eskilstuna City FK players
AFC Eskilstuna players
Eerste Divisie players
Superettan players
Division 2 (Swedish football) players
Dutch expatriate sportspeople in Sweden
Expatriate footballers in Sweden
Footballers from Limburg (Netherlands)